Patrick Craufurd Bruce (24 January 1748 – 30 March 1820) was a Member of Parliament in the early 19th century. He represented three constituencies; Evesham, Rye and Dundalk.

Life 
He planted vast forests in Berkshire, Dorset, Gloucestershire, Oxfordshire and Hampshire. Bruce's Wood was planted around the estuary of the River Bourne, which later became Bournemouth.

Family 
His son Michael Bruce, was also an MP.

See also 

 Bruce baronets

References 

1748 births
1820 deaths
UK MPs 1802–1806
UK MPs 1806–1807
UK MPs 1807–1812
19th-century Scottish politicians
Politicians from Bournemouth
People from Evesham
People from Rye, East Sussex
People from Dundalk